Robin Haase was the defending champion, but decided not to participate.

Potito Starace won the title. He played against Martin Kližan, but his opponent retired due to left foot injury, when the result was 6–1, 3–0.

Seeds

Draw

Finals

Top half

Bottom half

References
 Main Draw
 Qualifying Draw

San Marino CEPU Open - Singles
San Marino CEPU Open